The 1977 Dwars door België was the 32nd edition of the Dwars door Vlaanderen cycle race and was held on 27 March 1977. The race started and finished in Waregem. The race was won by Walter Planckaert.

General classification

References

1977
1977 in road cycling
1977 in Belgian sport